Diego Florentín was a Paraguayan football midfielder who played for Paraguay in the 1930 FIFA World Cup. He also played for Club River Plate.

References

External links
FIFA profile

Paraguayan footballers
Paraguay international footballers
Association football midfielders
1930 FIFA World Cup players
River Plate (Asunción) footballers
Year of birth missing
Year of death missing